Wells Saddle is a broad snow-filled saddle between Mount Berlin and Mount Moulton in the Flood Range of Marie Byrd Land. The saddle was photographed from aircraft of the United States Antarctic Service (USAS) in December 1940. It was mapped by United States Geological Survey (USGS) from ground surveys and U.S. Navy air photos, 1959–66. Named by Advisory Committee on Antarctic Names (US-ACAN) for James H. Wells, a member of the United States Antarctic Research Program (USARP) team that studied ice sheet dynamics in the area northeast of Byrd Station, 1971–72.

Mountain passes of Antarctica
Landforms of Marie Byrd Land
Flood Range